Family and Community Services may refer to:

 Department of Family and Community Services (Australia), an Australian Government department (1998–2006)
 Family and Community Services (South Australia), a former South Australian Government agency
 New South Wales Department of Family and Community Services , a former New South Wales Government Department (2011–2019)